Rumesh Buddika Muthukumarana (born 14 November 1990) is a Sri Lankan cricketer. He is a left-handed batsman and right-arm off-break bowler who currently plays for Chilaw Marians Cricket Club. He was born in Matara District and had his education at Mahinda College, Galle, where he started his cricket career.

Cricket career
He represented Sri Lanka in the 2010 ICC Under-19 Cricket World Cup, which was held in New Zealand.
Buddika, who played in the 2008 Under-23 tournament for Chilaw Marians, joined Ragama Cricket Club in 2009, with whom he reached the semi-finals of the same competition with their representative Under-23 team. Buddika made his List A debut in the Premier Limited Overs Tournament in 2009–10, against Colts. He later represented Tamil Union cricket club for few seasons, before moving to Galle Cricket Club in 2015/ 2016 season.

Rumesh has scored over 6000 first class runs including 16 hundreds. His career best performance is 239 not out for Tamil Union against Moors in 2014. He currently averages over 40 in first class cricket and is one of the most consistent performers in Sri Lankan club cricket. Rumesh Buddika also holds the Galle Cricket Club's record for the highest individual score by a batsman in first class cricket.

In March 2018, he was named in Galle's squad for the 2017–18 Super Four Provincial Tournament.
He was the leading run-scorer for Burgher Recreation Club in the 2018–19 Premier League Tournament, with 781 runs in nine matches. He is also a former captain of the  Sri Lankan Development Emerging Team.

Records and trivia
 In an Under 19 one day cricket match held between Sri Lanka and South Africa at Wanderers Stadium, Johannesburg in 2009, Rumesh Buddika outscored the entire opposition in their home conditions by 4 runs. He scored 139 runs in that game while the entire South African team managed to score only 135 runs.

References

External links
Rumesh Buddika at Cricket Archive

1990 births
Living people
Sri Lankan cricketers
Alumni of Mahinda College
Tamil Union Cricket and Athletic Club cricketers
Ragama Cricket Club cricketers
Wayamba cricketers
Sri Lanka Cricket Combined XI cricketers
Basnahira cricketers
Kurunegala Warriors cricketers